Hugh I of Le Puiset (died 23 December 1096), son of Everard I of Breteuil and his wife Humberge.

In 1067, taking advantage of the weakness of Philip I of France, he seized the royal castle of Puiset and settled there.  In 1073, Theobald III, Count of Blois, became Count of Chartres and did not hesitate to defy royal order, defeating the royal army in 1079 at Le Puiset.  He took as prisoner Ivo, Bishop of Chartres, and kept him confined for two years.

Hugh married Alice of Montlhéry, daughter of Guy I, lord of Montlhéry, and Hodierna de Gometz. The family of Montlhéry was also part of the turbulent nobility that King Louis VI would have to put down a generation later. The alliances of the Montlhéry Clan formed a broad network of nobles who engaged heavily in the Crusades.

Hugh and Alice had at least nine children:
 Odeline of Puiset (d. before 2 November 1107), married Joscelin IV of Lèves, a Crusader.  Their daughter (name unknown) married Ralph the Red of Pont-Echanfray.
 Éverard III, Seigneur of Puiset, Viscount of Chartres
 Hugh II, Seigneur of Puiset, Count of Jaffa (as Hugh I of Jaffa)
 Guy of Puiset (d. 1127 of after), Canon of Chartres, Seigneur of Méréville, Viscount d’Étampes
 Gilduin (d. 1135), Monk at Saint-Martin-des-Champs, Prior at Lurey-Le-Bourg, Abbot at Notre-Dame du Val, Josaphat
 Waleran (Galéran) (d. in prison 1126), made lord of Birecik in 1116 after its capture by Baldwin II.  Married the daughter of the previous lord, Abu'lgharib.
 Raoul of Puiset
 Humberge of Le Puiset, married Walo II of Beaumont-sur-Oise, Viscount of Chaumont-en-Vexin.  Their son Drogo was an early ancestor of the counts of Dammartin.
 Eustachie.

Hugh established a priory of Marmountier at Le Puiset.  See also the Houses of Montlhéry and Le Puiset.

Notes

References
 

1096 deaths
11th-century French people